Daniel Ferl (born 19 March 1980) is a German footballer who plays for 1.FC Zeitz.

References

External links

1980 births
Living people
German footballers
1. FC Lokomotive Leipzig players
Alemannia Aachen players
FC Sachsen Leipzig players
2. Bundesliga players
Association football central defenders
Footballers from Leipzig
21st-century German people